The flag of Castile and León is the official flag of the Spanish autonomous community of Castile and León. It consists of the quartered coats of arms of Castile, represented by a castle, and León, represented by a lion.

This flag is used to represent the two cultural identities who share this administrative region, the Castle for Castile, and the Lion for León.

The lion design is attributed to Alfonso VII of León, who became king of León and Castile in 1126. The castle symbol is attributed to his grandson Alfonso VIII of Castile, In 1230, Ferdinand III of Castile united the two kingdoms in the Crown of Castile (1230–1715) and quartered the arms as a symbol of the union.

Three centuries of Spanish presence on the American continents left a consistent footprint. In many areas of the Southern United States, for example, symbols of Spanish ancestry are preserved in the coat of arms or symbols of states and cities. Several cities, like Los Angeles, California and St. Augustine, Florida, incorporate the signs of the Kingdom of Castile on their shields or flags. In displays of the six flags that have flown over Texas, also flown in St. Augustine, Florida and Louisiana, Spain is usually represented by the flag of Castile and León.

Evolution and variations

Historic Royal Standard

Current flags and emblems

See also
 Coat of arms of Castile and León
 Flag of León
 Flag of Castile

References

External links

Flag, emblem and coat of arms of Castile and León

Flags of Spain
Flag
Flags displaying animals